The NS 4300 was a series of steam locomotives of the Dutch Railways (NS), taken over from the British War Department.

The locomotives, with 1'D wheel arrangement, were built between 1943 and 1945 by North British Locomotive Company and the Vulcan Foundry for the British War Department to supply the British Army with supplies during their fight against the German army in the West of mainland Europe.

Some of the British War Department were in service with NS after the war. Although a total of 237 locomotives were leased, they weren't in service simultaneously. The drivers, who had to stand on the left side of these English machines, had a lot of trouble due to drifting smoke. The Dutch Railways soon lowered the boiler pressure from 15.8 kg/cm² (225  psi) to 12 kg/cm² (170 psi) and extended the chimneys to clear the driver's view from the drifting smoke.

The locomotives were nicknamed 'Little Jeeps'.

Design 
The Austerity 2-8-0 was based on the LMS Class 8F, which had been the government's standard design until that point. Several changes were made to the 8F design by R.A. Riddles to prioritize low cost over the life of the design. These included a boiler of simpler construction that was parallel rather than tapered and a round-topped firebox instead of a Belpaire firebox. The firebox was made of steel rather than the rare and more expensive copper.

Construction 
Construction was divided between two companies. The North British Locomotive Company (NBL) in Glasgow built 545 locomotives (divided between their two workshops in Hyde Park and Queen's Park) and the Vulcan Foundry (VF) in Newton-le-Willows, Lancashire, built 390 locomotives.

The North British Locomotive Company also built the larger NS 5000 WD.

Preservation 
There are no locomotives of this series left in the Netherlands.

One of the original WD 2-8-0 is preserved on the Keighley & Worth Valley Railway in Yorkshire. It was built by the Vulcan Foundry as No. 5200. The locomotive was purchased from the Swedish State Railways (Statens Järnvägar). It was classified there as SJ Class G11 No. 1931.

In 2007 the locomotive was restored to its original condition, with a new cab and tender having to be built. The locomotive then became British Railways (BR) No. 90733 and after a few test runs, 90733 ran its first passenger train on the KWVR on June 23, 2007.

Gallery

Sources and references 

 

 

Rolling stock of the Netherlands
2-8-0 locomotives
Vulcan Foundry locomotives
Steam locomotives of the Netherlands
NBL locomotives